The Treaty of Paris, also known as the Treaty of 1763, was signed on 10 February 1763 by the kingdoms of Great Britain, France and Spain, with Portugal in agreement, after Great Britain and Prussia's victory over France and Spain during the Seven Years' War.

The signing of the treaty formally ended the conflict between France and Great Britain over control of North America (the Seven Years' War, known as the French and Indian War in the United States), and marked the beginning of an era of British dominance outside Europe. Great Britain and France each returned much of the territory that they had captured during the war, but Great Britain gained much of France's possessions in North America. Additionally, Great Britain agreed to protect Roman Catholicism in the New World. The treaty did not involve Prussia and Austria as they signed a separate agreement, the Treaty of Hubertusburg, five days later.

Exchange of territories
During the war, Great Britain had conquered the French colonies of Canada, Guadeloupe, Saint Lucia, Martinique, Dominica, Grenada, Saint Vincent and the Grenadines, and Tobago, the French "factoreries" (trading posts) in India, the slave-trading station at Gorée, the Sénégal River and its settlements, and the Spanish colonies of Manila (in the Philippines) and Havana (in Cuba). France had captured Minorca and British trading posts in Sumatra, while Spain had captured the border fortress of Almeida in Portugal, and Colonia del Sacramento in South America.

The treaty restored most of the territories to their original owners, but Britain was allowed to keep considerable gains. France and Spain restored all their conquests to Britain and Portugal. Britain restored Manila and Havana to Spain, and Guadeloupe, Martinique, Saint Lucia, Gorée, and the Indian factories to France. In return, France recognized the sovereignty of Britain over Canada, Dominica, Grenada, Saint Vincent and the Grenadines, and Tobago.

France also ceded the eastern half of French Louisiana to Britain; that is, the area from the Mississippi River to the Appalachian Mountains. France had already secretly given Louisiana to Spain in the Treaty of Fontainebleau (1762), but Spain did not take possession until 1769. Spain ceded East Florida to Britain. In addition, France regained its factories in India but recognized British clients as the rulers of key Indian native states and pledged not to send troops to Bengal. Britain agreed to demolish its fortifications in British Honduras (now Belize) but retained a logwood-cutting colony there. Britain confirmed the right of its new subjects to practise Catholicism.

France lost all of its territory in mainland North America except for the territory of Louisiana west of the Mississippi River. France retained fishing rights off Newfoundland and the two small islands of Saint Pierre and Miquelon, where its fishermen could dry their catch. In turn, France gained the return of its sugar colony, Guadeloupe, which it considered more valuable than Canada.

Louisiana question
The Treaty of Paris is notable because it furthered the transfer of Louisiana from France to Spain. However, the agreement to transfer had occurred with the Treaty of Fontainebleau (1762), but it was not publicly announced until 1764. The Treaty of Paris gave Britain the east side of the Mississippi (including Baton Rouge, Louisiana, which was to be part of the British territory of West Florida). On the east side, New Orleans remained in French hands (albeit temporarily). The Mississippi River corridor in what is now Louisiana was later reunited following the Louisiana Purchase in 1803 and the Adams–Onís Treaty in 1819.

The 1763 treaty states in Article VII:

Canada question

British perspective
The war was fought all over the world, but the British began the war over French possessions in North America. After a long debate of the relative merits of Guadeloupe, which produced £6 million a year in sugar, and Canada, which was expensive to keep, Great Britain decided to keep Canada for strategic reasons and to return Guadeloupe to France. The war had weakened France, but it was still a European power. British Prime Minister Lord Bute wanted a peace that would not push France towards a second war.

Although the Protestant British worried about having so many Roman Catholic subjects, Great Britain did not want to antagonize France by expulsion or forced conversion or for French settlers to leave Canada to strengthen other French settlements in North America.

French perspective
Unlike Lord Bute, the French Foreign Minister, the Duke of Choiseul, expected a return to war. However, France needed peace to rebuild. France preferred to keep its Caribbean possessions with their profitable sugar trade, rather than the vast Canadian lands, which had been a financial burden on France. French diplomats believed that without France to keep the Americans in check, the colonists might attempt to revolt. In Canada, France wanted open emigration for those, such as the nobility, who would not swear allegiance to the British Crown. Finally, France required protection for Roman Catholics in North America.

Article IV stated:

Dunkirk question
During the negotiations that led to the treaty, a major issue of dispute between Britain and France had been over the status of the fortifications of the French coastal settlement of Dunkirk. The British had long feared that it would be used as a staging post to launch a French invasion of Britain. Under the 1713 Treaty of Utrecht, the British forced France to concede extreme limits on those fortifications. The 1748 Treaty of Aix-la-Chapelle had allowed more generous terms, and France constructed more significant defences for the town.

The 1763 treaty had Britain force France to accept the 1713 conditions and demolish the fortifications constructed since then. That would be a continuing source of resentment to France, which would eventually have that provision overturned in the 1783 Treaty of Paris, which brought an end to the American Revolutionary War.

Reactions

When Lord Bute became the British prime minister in 1762, he pushed for a resolution to the war with France and Spain since he feared that Great Britain could not govern all of its newly acquired territories. In what Winston Churchill would later term a policy of "appeasement", Bute returned some colonies to Spain and France in the negotiations.

Despite a desire for peace, many in the British Parliament opposed the return of any gains made during the war. Notable among the opposition was former Prime Minister William Pitt, the Elder, who warned that the terms of the treaty would lead to further conflicts once France and Spain had time to rebuild and later said, "The peace was insecure because it restored the enemy to her former greatness. The peace was inadequate, because the places gained were no equivalent for the places surrendered." The treaty passed by 319 votes to 65.

The Treaty of Paris took no consideration of Great Britain's battered continental ally, Frederick II of Prussia, who negotiated peace terms separately in the Treaty of Hubertusburg. For decades after the signing of the Treaty of Paris, Frederick II decried it as a British betrayal.

Many Protestant American colonists were disappointed by the protection of Roman Catholicism in the Treaty of Paris. Criticism of the British colonial government as insufficiently anti-Catholic and fear of the protections for Catholicism expanding beyond Quebec was one of many reasons for the breakdown of American–British relations that led to the American Revolution.

Effects on French Canada

The article permitted unrestrained emigration for 18 months from Canada. However, passage on British ships was expensive. A total of 1,600 people left New France by that clause, but only 270 of them were French Canadians. Some claim that there was a deliberate British policy to limit emigration to avoid strengthening other French colonies.

Article IV of the treaty allowed Roman Catholicism to be practiced in Canada. George III agreed to allow Catholicism within the laws of Great Britain, which included various Test Acts to prevent governmental, judicial and bureaucratic appointments from going to Roman Catholics. They were believed to be agents of the Jacobite pretenders to the throne, who normally resided in France and were supported by its government. The Test Acts were somewhat relaxed in Quebec, but top positions such as governorships were still held by Anglicans.

Article IV has also been cited as the basis for Quebec's unique legal code that differs from the rest of Canada. There was a general constitutional principle in the United Kingdom allowing colonies taken through conquest to continue their laws. That was limited by royal prerogative, which allowed the monarch to change the accepted laws in a conquered colony later. However, the treaty eliminated that power because of a different constitutional principle, which considered the terms of a treaty to be paramount. In practice, Roman Catholics were allowed to become jurors in inferior courts in Quebec and to argue based on principles of French law. However, the judge was British, and his opinion on French law could be limited or hostile. If the case was appealed to a superior court, neither French law nor Roman Catholic jurors were allowed.

Many French residents of what are now the Maritime Provinces of Canada were deported during the Great Expulsion of the Acadians (1755–1763). After signing the peace treaty guaranteed some rights to Roman Catholics, some Acadians returned to Canada. However, they were no longer welcome in the British colony of Nova Scotia. They were forced into New Brunswick, which became a bilingual province as a result of that relocation.

Britain now owned much land that France had owned, and the French people of Quebec felt greatly betrayed by the French concession. The commander-in-chief of the British, Jeffrey Amherst noted, "Many of the Canadians consider their Colony to be of utmost consequence to France & cannot be convinced ... that their Country has been conceded to Great Britain."

See also
 France in the Seven Years' War
 Great Britain in the Seven Years' War
 Royal Proclamation of 1763
 List of treaties

References

Further reading

External links
Treaty of Paris Profile and Videos – Chickasaw.TV

 The Treaty of Paris and its Consequences 
 Entry on the Treaty of Paris from The Canadian Encyclopedia
 Treaty of Paris at the Avalon Project of the Yale Law School

Treaties of the Seven Years' War
1763 treaties
Paris (1763)
Paris (1763)
1763 in France
1763 in Great Britain
1763 in Spain
18th century in Paris
France–Great Britain relations
French and Indian War
History of Saint Pierre and Miquelon
Legal history of Canada
Military history of Quebec
New France
Pre-Confederation Canada
1763 in the British Empire
1763 in the French colonial empire
1763 in Canada
1763 in New France
1763 in North America
History of Quebec
Pre-Confederation Quebec